The Golden Globet Award for Best Screenplay (Chinese: 金爵奖最佳编剧) is a prize given to the films in the main category of competition at the Shanghai International Film Festival.

Award Winners

References

Lists of films by award
Shanghai International Film Festival